Lathusia ferruginea' is a species of beetle in the family Cerambycidae. It was described by Bruch in 1908.

References

Rhopalophorini
Beetles described in 1908